
Year 587 (DLXXXVII) was a common year starting on Wednesday (link will display the full calendar) of the Julian calendar. The denomination 587 for this year has been used since the early medieval period, when the Anno Domini calendar era became the prevalent method in Europe for naming years.

Events 
 By place 

 Byzantine Empire 
 Emperor Maurice builds more fortifications along the Danube frontier, separating the Byzantine Empire from the realm of the Avars and Slavs (approximate date).
 Comentiolus, Byzantine general (magister militum), assembles an army of 10,000 men at Anchialus (modern Bulgaria). He prepares an ambush for the Avars in the Haemus mountains.

 Europe 
 King Guntram sends envoys to Brittany, to stop the raiding on Frankish territory. He compels obedience from Waroch II and demands 1,000 solidus for looting Nantes.
 King Reccared I renounces Arianism and adopts Catholicism. Many Visigothic nobles follow his example, but in Septimania (Southern Gaul) there are Arian uprisings.
 November 28 – Treaty of Andelot: Guntram recognizes King Childebert II of Austrasia as heir. He signs a treaty with Queen Brunhilda at Andelot-Blancheville.
 Winter – Childebert II appoints Uncelen as the Duke of Alemannia (approximate date).

 Britain 

 Sledd succeeds his father Æscwine as king of Essex (approximate date).

 Asia 
 Battle of Shigisan: The Soga clan, which has intermarried with the royal Yamato clan, fights the Mononobe and Nakatomi clans over influence in selecting a new successor for the Japanese throne, after Emperor Yōmei dies. The Soga favor importing Buddhism from the Asian mainland, described there as the religion of the most civilized. The Mononobe and Nakatomi hold that Buddhism would be an affront to the gods. The Soga win the civil war and Sushun, age 66, becomes the 32nd emperor of Japan.
 Fall – The Liang dynasty ends: Emperor Wéndi of the Sui Dynasty abolishes Western Liang and expands his territory into the lower valley of the Yangtze River. He sends his official Gao Jiong to the capital Jiangling, to pacify the citizens. The former emperor Xiao Jing Di becomes a vassal and is named the Duke of Liang.
 Bagha Qaghan becomes the seventh ruler (khagan) of the Turkic Kaganate.

 By topic 

 Religion 
 The filioque clause is first used in the Nicene Creed, against the Arians in Visigothic Spain (approximate date).

Births 
 Soga no Emishi, statesman of Japan (d. 645)
 Theuderic II, king of Austrasia (d. 613)
 Zhang Xingcheng, chancellor of the Tang Dynasty (d. 653)

Deaths 
 April – Yōmei, emperor of Japan (b. 518)
 August 13 – Radegund, Frankish princess
 Æscwine, king of Essex (approximate date)
 Ishbara Qaghan, ruler (khagan) of the Göktürks
 Mononobe no Moriya, clan leader (Ō-muraji)
 Varāhamihira, Indian astronomer (b. 505)

References

Sources